The Ivanov ZJ-Viera (Faith) is a Czech ultralight and light-sport aircraft that was designed by Marek Ivanov and produced by Ivanov Aero s.r.o. of Hradec Králové. The aircraft was supplied as a kit for amateur construction or complete and ready-to-fly.

Ivanov Aero seems to have been founded about 2008 and gone out of business in 2016. The design is apparently out of production.

Design and development
The ZJ-Viera was designed to comply with the European single seat deregulated rules and US FAR 103 Ultralight Vehicles rules, with an empty weight of just . It features a cantilever low-wing, a single-seat open cockpit with a windshield, fixed monowheel landing gear with wingtip wheels, or optionally tricycle landing gear, and a single engine in tractor configuration, mounted on a short nose pylon.

The aircraft is made from composite materials. The standard engine used is the  Hirth F-33 two-stroke powerplant, although a  engine can be used.

Before the company went out of business in late 2013, InterPlane Aircraft acted as distributor for the design, touting it for the US FAR 103 Ultralight category and the light-sport aircraft category.

As of February 2017, the design does not appear on the Federal Aviation Administration's list of approved special light-sport aircraft.

Operational history
Reviewer Marino Boric described the design in a 2015 review as "the dream of ultralighting returns, but with a 21st century feel! Ultralight on the wallet, too, thanks to a combination of simple design and modern all-composite construction...this airplane shows every sign of becoming a landmark design".

Specifications (ZJ-Viera)

References

External links
Official website archives on Archive.org

InterPlane aircraft
2000s Czech ultralight aircraft
Homebuilt aircraft
Light-sport aircraft
Single-engined tractor aircraft